The 2013 Horizon League women's basketball tournament took place at the end of the 2012–13 regular season.

Seeds
All Horizon League schools played in the tournament. Teams were seeded by 2012–13 Horizon League regular season record, with a tiebreaker system to seed teams with identical conference records. The top 7 teams received a bye to the quarterfinals.

Bracket

See also
 Horizon League Women's Basketball Champions

References

2013 Horizon League Womenand#39;s Basketball Tournament
Horizon League women's basketball tournament